{{DISPLAYTITLE:C12H19NO4}}
The molecular formula C12H19NO4 (molar mass : 239.27 g/mol) may refer to :
 BOM (psychedelic)
 2,5-Dimethoxy-3,4-methylenedioxyamphetamine